Pabellón Ciudad de Algeciras-Doctor Juan Carlos Mateo is an arena in Algeciras, Spain.  It is primarily used for team handball and is the home arena of Algeciras BM.  The arena holds 2,300 people.

Initially named as only Ciudad de Algeciras, on 10 May 2017, the pavilion changed its denomination by adding the name of Doctor Juan Carlos Mateo.

References

Handball venues in Spain
Indoor arenas in Spain
Sports venues in Andalusia
Sport in Algeciras